Gimadanga is the largest village of Patgati Union in Tungipara Upazila, Gopalganj District, Bangladesh.

History
Gimadanga was once under water, so the people lived on higher land. The village is called Gimadanga because, in the Bengali language, high land surrounded by water on every side is called danga. As the village is large, different parts are named Purbopara, Possimpara, Dokhinpara, Uttarpara, and Moddhopara.

Economy
Agriculture is the main occupation in this village, but some people are employed by the government.

Education
Gimdanga Tungipara Government High School is the only secondary school in the village.

See also
 List of villages in Bangladesh

References

 

Populated places in Dhaka Division
Villages in Gopalganj District, Bangladesh
Villages in Dhaka Division